Henri Bossi (born 20 February 1958) is a retired Luxembourgian football midfielder and later manager. He currently trains soccer teams.

References

1958 births
Living people
Association football midfielders
Luxembourgian footballers
Luxembourg international footballers
FC Progrès Niederkorn players
Luxembourgian football managers
CS Fola Esch managers
US Mondorf-les-Bains managers
FC Progrès Niederkorn managers
FC Wiltz 71 managers